Adnan Ali Daif  is a Bahrainian footballer who played for Bahrain in the 1988 Asian Cup.

External links
11v11 Profile

Bahraini footballers
Bahrain international footballers
Association football defenders
1988 AFC Asian Cup players
Year of birth missing (living people)
Living people